Acrobasis encaustella is a species of snout moth in the genus Acrobasis. It was described by Ragonot, in 1893. It is found in China.

References

Moths described in 1893
Acrobasis
Moths of Asia